Polypedates pseudotilophus is a species of frogs in the family Rhacophoridae. It is endemic to Sumatra and Java in Indonesia.

References

 Matsui, Hamidy & Kuraishi, 2014 : A new species of Polypedates from Sumatra, Indonesia (Amphibia: Anura). Species Diversity, .
http://research.amnh.org/vz/herpetology/amphibia/Amphibia/Anura/Rhacophoridae/Rhacophorinae/Polypedates/Polypedates-pseudotilophus

pseudotilophus
Amphibians of Indonesia
Frogs of Asia
Amphibians described in 2014